UFC Fight Night: Bigfoot vs. Arlovski (also known as UFC Fight Night 51) was a mixed martial arts event held on September 13, 2014, at Ginásio Nilson Nelson in Brasília, Brazil.

Background
The event in Brasília was the first that the organization hosted in the Brazilian capital city.

The event was headlined by a heavyweight rematch between Antônio Silva and Andrei Arlovski. Their first fight at Strikeforce: Heavy Artillery ended in a unanimous decision victory for Silva.

Mike Rhodes was expected to face Paulo Thiago at the event. However, Rhodes was forced out of the bout due to injury, and was briefly replaced by returning veteran Joe Riggs. On July 29, it was announced that Riggs had to pull out of the bout due to a gun accident with non-life-threatening injuries in his house. On the same day Sean Spencer replaced Riggs as Thiago's new opponent.

Sérgio Moraes was expected to face Santiago Ponzinibbio at the event. However, Moraes pulled out of the bout citing a lingering knee injury. He was replaced by promotional newcomer Wendell Oliveira.

Valérie Létourneau was expected to face Jéssica Andrade at the event. However, Létourneau pulled out of the bout citing an injury and was replaced by promotional newcomer and former Jungle Fight women's bantamweight champion Larissa Pacheco.

Promotional newcomer Łukasz Sajewski was expected to make his debut at the event against Leonardo Santos. Sajewski was removed from the card and Santos faced Efrain Escudero. While Escudero's initial opponent Francisco Trinaldo faced Leandro Silva.

Results

Bonus awards
The following fighters were awarded $50,000 bonuses:

Fight of the Night: Gleison Tibau vs. Piotr Hallmann ^
 Performance of the Night: Andrei Arlovski and Godofredo Pepey
^ Bonus winner Piotr Hallmann had his award rescinded after testing positive for drostanolone during his post fight drug screening.

See also
List of UFC events
2014 in UFC

References

UFC Fight Night
Mixed martial arts in Brazil
Sport in Brasília
2014 in mixed martial arts